John Russell Taylor (c. 1908 – 26 March 1961 ) was a Member of the Queensland Legislative Assembly. He represented the seats of Maranoa from 1944 to 1950 and Balonne from 1950 to 1957.

Taylor died in 1961 while attending his daughter's wedding and was buried in Lutwyche Cemetery.

References

Members of the Queensland Legislative Assembly
1900s births
1961 deaths
Burials at Lutwyche Cemetery
Australian Labor Party members of the Parliament of Queensland
20th-century Australian politicians